English invasion of Scotland may refer to:

 English invasion of Scotland (1296), by Edward I of England
 English invasion of Scotland (1298), by Edward I of England
 English invasion of Scotland (1300), by Edward I of England
 English invasion of Scotland (1385), by Richard II of England
 English invasion of Scotland (1400), by Henry IV of England
 English invasion of Scotland (1482), by Alexander Stewart, Duke of Albany and brother of James III of Scotland
 English invasion of Scotland (1650), by the New Model Army under Oliver Cromwell
 English invasions of Scotland, a list of historical battles

See also
 Scottish invasion of England, a list of historical battles